is the 7th single by the Japanese idol girl group Onyanko Club. It was released in Japan on January 21, 1987.

Track listing

Charts

Weekly charts

Year-end charts

References 

Onyanko Club songs
1987 songs
1987 singles
Songs with lyrics by Yasushi Akimoto
Pony Canyon singles
Oricon Weekly number-one singles
Songs written by Tsugutoshi Gotō